Rattenberg is a City on the Inn River in the Austrian state of Tyrol near Rattenberg mountain and Innsbruck. With just 400 inhabitants and a surface area of 10 ha, it is the smallest city in the country.

Geography
The proximity of a mountain to the south of the town means that Rattenberg, like many villages nested in steep sided valleys throughout the Tyrol region of the Alps, receives no direct sunlight for much of the winter. It is one of the few places at a significant southerly latitude that experiences a prolonged period without direct sunlight (another is Viganella, Italy), although the sky remains bright while the town is in the mountain's shadow so there is no permanent darkness or 'polar night' as experienced north of the Arctic Circle.

Gallery

History
Founded in the 14th century, it was built in the literal shadow of Rat Mountain to protect itself from marauders. Maximilian I had the original town citadel expanded to a formidable fortress.

The modern era
In November 2005, the town announced they were building 30 specialized rotating mirrors called heliostats to reflect sunlight into parts of the town during the winter months. The $2.4 million operation was suggested by Bartenbach Lichtlabor GmbH, a lighting design company. The EU planned to foot half the bill as of November 2005. However, the project was never implemented.

Population

Economy

Rattenberg has been known for its glass making. Its abundance of crystal glass shops continue the tradition of craftsmanship.

See also

 Rjukan, Norway and Viganella, Italy - other valley settlements that endure a prolonged lack of direct winter sunlight.

References

External links
Website of the Rattenberg Tourist Board

Cities and towns in Kufstein District